Jean-Eric Maxim Choupo-Moting (born 23 March 1989) is a professional footballer who plays as a forward for  club Bayern Munich. Born in Germany, he plays for the Cameroon national team.

Choupo-Moting began his career with Hamburger SV, making his Bundesliga debut in August 2007. He spent the 2009–10 season on loan at 1. FC Nürnberg and in August 2011 he joined 1. FSV Mainz 05. After three seasons with Mainz he moved on to Schalke 04 in August 2014. He became a regular for the Gelsenkirchen club, and made over 80 appearances, before joining Premier League side Stoke City in August 2017. Struggling for minutes in the EFL Championship with Stoke, he decided to move to Ligue 1 club Paris Saint-Germain on a two-year deal in August 2018. After his contract with Paris Saint-Germain expired, Choupo-Moting returned to the Bundesliga and joined Bayern Munich in October 2020 on a free transfer.

Club career

Early career
Choupo-Moting was born in Hamburg to a German mother and a Cameroonian father and began playing football at an early age. He played in the youth teams at Teutonia 05, Altona 93 and FC St. Pauli before joining Hamburger SV in 2004. He played semi-professional football with Hamburger SV II in the Regionalliga Nord before breaking into the first team in August 2007.

Hamburger SV

Choupo-Moting made his first appearance as a Hamburger SV player in a Bundesliga match on 11 August 2007, being sent on as a substitute in the 69th minute against Hannover 96. Choupo-Moting struggled to establish himself in Martin Jol's side and he spent the 2009–10 season on loan at 1. FC Nürnberg with whom he scored six goals in 27 appearances helping Nürnberg retain their Bundesliga status. On his return to Hamburg, Choupo-Moting struggled to make much impact in 2010–11 and after scoring just two goals by January he was set for another loan move this time to 1. FC Köln, however the move fell through after registration documents were faxed to the German Football Association too late. After his botched transfer he spent the second half of the campaign with the reserves.

Mainz 05
On 18 May 2011, Choupo-Moting signed a three-year contract with Bundesliga side 1. FSV Mainz 05 on a free transfer from Hamburg. Choupo-Moting enjoyed a successful 2011–12 season with the club, scoring ten times in the Bundesliga. However, he missed most of the 2012–13 season with a knee injury and was therefore unable to make an impact. He returned to form in 2013–14, scoring ten goals in 32 appearances helping Mainz secure seventh position and qualification to the UEFA Europa League, however at the end of the campaign he decided not to renew his contract with the club.

Schalke 04

On 5 July 2014, after Choupo-Moting's contract expired at Mainz, FC Schalke 04 confirmed he had signed a three-year professional contract with them until 30 June 2017. The transfer was reported as a free transfer by Schalke's sport and communications manager Horst Heldt. Choupo-Moting was assigned the squad number 13.

On 6 December 2014, he scored a hat-trick in a 4–0 home win over VfB Stuttgart.

Stoke City
On 7 August 2017, Choupo-Moting joined Premier League side Stoke City on a three-year contract. He made his debut for Stoke on 12 August 2017 against Everton. Choupo-Moting scored both goals in a 2–2 draw against Manchester United on 9 September 2017 and was named man of the match by BBC Sport. Against Everton, he came on as a substitute, scored within five minutes of his arrival, but injured himself in the process and Stoke lost 2–1. Choupo-Moting played 32 times in 2017–18, scoring five goals as Stoke suffered relegation to the EFL Championship.

Paris Saint-Germain

2018–19 season 
On 31 August 2018, Choupo-Moting joined Ligue 1 champions Paris Saint-Germain on a free transfer. He made his debut for the club on 18 September 2018 in the 3–2 Champions League away defeat against Liverpool before scoring on his Ligue 1 debut against Rennes five days later. On 7 April 2019, Choupo-Moting made a mistake in the Ligue 1 home match against Strasbourg; when a shot from teammate Christopher Nkunku was about to cross the goal line, Choupo-Moting attempted to touch the ball with his left foot across the goal line but instead unintentionally diverted the ball onto the near post and prevented a certain goal. The BBC described it as "one of the worst misses in the history of football".

2019–20 season 
On 25 August 2019, Choupo-Moting came off the bench to replace the injured Edinson Cavani in the 16th minute and scored twice in the second half of a 4–0 home win over Toulouse; his first goal was a superb solo goal scored after he beat four Toulouse defenders in the penalty area. On 12 August 2020, Choupo-Moting scored in the third minute of stoppage time against Atalanta in the Champions League, completing a late turnaround for PSG and sending the team into the semi-finals of the competition for the first time in 25 years. Later on, he came on as a substitute in the Champions League final, which ended in a 1–0 defeat for Paris Saint-Germain against Bayern Munich.

Bayern Munich

2020–21 season 
On 5 October 2020, Choupo-Moting joined Bayern Munich on a one-year contract. Choupo-Moting made his debut for Bayern in the first round of the DFB-Pokal on 15 October and scored twice as the club defeated fifth division side 1. FC Düren by a score of 3–0. On 9 December, he scored his first Champions League goal with Bayern Munich in a 2–0 win over Lokomotiv Moscow. He scored his first league goal on 25 February 2021, scoring the first goal in Bayern's 5–1 victory over 1. FC Köln. In April 2021, he scored in both Champions League quarter-final matches against his former club Paris Saint-Germain, including a 1–0 away win at Parc des Princes, yet his club lost on the away goals rule after a 3–3 draw on aggregate. In May 2021, he lifted his first Bundesliga title with Bayern.

2021–22 season 
On 17 August 2021, he came on in the 88th minute for Robert Lewandowski during the 2021 DFL-Supercup, a 3–1 win over Borussia Dortmund to clinch the DFL-Supercup title. On 25 August 2021, he scored his first hat-trick at Bayern after scoring four goals in the club's first round 12–0 win over Bremer SV in the DFB-Pokal. This made him the first Bayern player since March 2005 when Claudio Pizarro scored four goals against Freiburg in the 2004–05 DFB-Pokal season. He also set up three other goals in the match, making him the first ever Bayern player to be directly involved in seven goals in the DFB-Pokal since records began in the 2008–09 season.

2022–23 season 
On 16 October 2022, he scored his first Bundesliga goal of the season in a 5–0 win over Freiburg. Afterwards, he scored a goal in each of the last two group stage matches against Barcelona and Inter Milan, in which Bayern Munich finished top of their Group C with six wins out of six matches for the second year in a row. On 3 March 2023, he signed a one-year contract extension until 30 June 2024.

International career

Germany
Choupo-Moting has a German passport and represented his country of birth and his mother's country Germany at the 2008 UEFA European Under-19 Championship qualification for the 2008 UEFA European Under-19 Championship and at the 2011 UEFA European Under-21 Championship qualification for the 2011 UEFA European Under-21 Championship.

Cameroon

2010 World Cup

On 11 May 2010, Choupo-Moting earned his first call-up for the Cameroon national team, and represented Cameroon at the 2010 FIFA World Cup in South Africa.

Cameroon eligibility investigation
The Tunisian Football Federation, which governs the Tunisia national team, had questioned FIFA on whether Choupo-Moting fulfilled nationality criteria to play for Cameroon. "With regards to the protest lodged by the Tunisian Football Federation in relation to the eligibility of Choupo-Moting representing Cameroon, FIFA had communicated to the Tunisia Football Federation that no breach of the FIFA regulations has been committed by the Cameroonian Football Federation," a FIFA spokesman told BBC Sport. Choupo-Moting played for both the Germany national youth football teams and the Germany national under-21 team, including being born in Germany and growing up in Germany with German parentage, but had his switch of national allegiance approved by FIFA before representing Cameroon. The Tunisian Football Federation's complaint came during the 2014 FIFA World Cup qualification – CAF Third Round despite Choupo-Moting playing at the 2010 World Cup in South Africa.

2014 and 2022 World Cups
In June 2014, he was called up for Cameroon's World Cup squad for the 2014 World Cup in Brazil. On 3 January 2017, he announced that he would not play in the 2017 Africa Cup of Nations.

On 29 March 2022, during the third round of the 2022 FIFA World Cup qualification, he scored a goal for Cameroon to lead 1–0 in an away match against Algeria, which equalized the tie 1–1 on aggregate. That match went on into extra time and both teams scored; hence, Cameroon qualified to the 2022 FIFA World Cup on away goals.

On 9 November 2022, he was included in the 26-man squad for the 2022 FIFA World Cup in Qatar. On 28 November, he scored his first World Cup goal in a 3–3 draw against Serbia.

Personal life
Choupo-Moting was born in Altona, Hamburg, and he attended Gymnasium Altona. He was born to a German mother and Cameroonian father.

Choupo-Moting has a German wife named Nevin. They have one son, Liam, who was born on 17 October 2013.

Style of play
Choupo-Moting is often stationed as a striker or on the left wing. He is a composed finisher and possesses purposeful and powerful dribbling ability, comfortable on either left or right flanks or through the middle of the pitch. Choupo-Moting is known for high work rate, long stride and powerful, direct dribbling ability.

Career statistics

Club

International

As of match played 28 November 2022. Cameroon score listed first, score column indicates score after each Choupo-Moting goal.

Honours
Paris Saint-Germain
 Ligue 1: 2018–19, 2019–20
 Coupe de France: 2019–20
 Coupe de la Ligue: 2019–20
 UEFA Champions League runner-up: 2019–20
Bayern Munich
 Bundesliga: 2020–21, 2021–22
 DFL-Supercup: 2021, 2022
 FIFA Club World Cup: 2020
Cameroon

 African Cup of Nations third place: 2021

Individual
 Fritz Walter Medal U18 Silver: 2007

References

External links

 Profile at the FC Bayern Munich website
 
 
 

1989 births
Living people
Footballers from Hamburg
German people of Cameroonian descent
Cameroonian people of German descent
German sportspeople of African descent
Sportspeople of Cameroonian descent
Citizens of Cameroon through descent
Cameroonian footballers
Association football forwards
FC Teutonia Ottensen players
Altonaer FC von 1893 players
Hamburger SV II players
Hamburger SV players
1. FC Nürnberg players
1. FSV Mainz 05 players
1. FSV Mainz 05 II players
FC Schalke 04 players
Stoke City F.C. players
Paris Saint-Germain F.C. players
FC Bayern Munich footballers
Bundesliga players
Premier League players
Ligue 1 players
Germany youth international footballers
Germany under-21 international footballers
Cameroon international footballers
2010 FIFA World Cup players
2014 FIFA World Cup players
2015 Africa Cup of Nations players
2019 Africa Cup of Nations players
2021 Africa Cup of Nations players
2022 FIFA World Cup players
German expatriate footballers
Cameroonian expatriate footballers
German expatriate sportspeople in England
German expatriate sportspeople in France
Cameroonian expatriate sportspeople in England
Cameroonian expatriate sportspeople in France
Expatriate footballers in England
Expatriate footballers in France